Mitar Lukić (born 22 October 1957) is a Bosnian professional football manager and former player who is the manager of Second League of RS (Group West) club Borac Šamac.

Playing career
Born in Gračanica, SR Bosnia and Herzegovina, SFR Yugoslavia, Lukić started his playing career at hometown club Bratstvo Gračanica. He also had a spell with Drina Zvornik before joining Sloboda Tuzla in 1984. He played for Sloboda until 1991, with the exception of the season 1988–89 which he spent abroad playing in the Turkish Süper Lig for Trabzonspor. He finished his playing career in Serbia playing for Mačva Šabac.

Managerial career
After retiring, Lukić began his managerial career in Bosnia and Herzegovina with Modriča, winning the 2003–04 Bosnian Cup. He returned to Modriča in 2008, but later became manager of Crvena Zemlja. Lukić then again returned to Modriča, after which he worked at Tekstilac Derventa and most recently Sloga Doboj. Since August 2019, he has been the manager of Second League of RS (Group West) club Borac Šamac.

Personal life
Lukić's son, Jovo, is also a professional footballer who currently plays for Bosnian Premier League club Borac Banja Luka. They are originally from Skipovac.

Honours

Manager
Modriča 
Bosnian Cup: 2003–04

References

External links
 

1957 births
Living people
People from Gračanica, Bosnia and Herzegovina
Serbs of Bosnia and Herzegovina
Yugoslav footballers
Yugoslav expatriate footballers 
Expatriate footballers in Turkey
Yugoslav First League players
Süper Lig players
NK Bratstvo Gračanica players 
FK Drina Zvornik players
FK Sloboda Tuzla players
Trabzonspor footballers
FK Mačva Šabac players
Association football midfielders
Bosnia and Herzegovina football managers
Premier League of Bosnia and Herzegovina managers
FK Modriča managers